Events from the year 1736 in Russia

Incumbents
 Monarch – Anna

Events

  Siege of Perekop (1736)

Births

Deaths

References

1736 in Russia
Years of the 18th century in the Russian Empire